The Medina City Hall in Medina, Tennessee was built in 1936.  It was listed on the National Register of Historic Places in 2004.

It is "a two-part commercial, two-story rectangular brick building with a brick foundation."

References

National Register of Historic Places in Gibson County, Tennessee
Government buildings completed in 1936